Mersin station is the main railway terminal in the city of Mersin, Turkey. The station is located in the ilçe (district) of Akdeniz. The station is in use since 1886.

The railway 
It became a part of the Berlin-Baghdad Railway in 1911. This increased the traffic of the station, for the Central Anatolia became the hinterland of the port. After the Republic of Turkey was proclaimed in 1923, Turkish government began the railway nationalization project. According to act no.1376 (Jan. 5, 1929) Adana-Mersin railway was also absorbed by the  Chemins de Fer Ottomans d'Anatolie, a subsidiary of the Turkish State Railways (TCDD).

The station 

The original station building survives and is used for certain offices. But in 1955 a newer station building has been constructed within the same yard.

Trains 
The majority of the trains using Mersin station are freight trains. The main passenger train is between Mersin and Adana, 23 times a day with 9 stops in between.  Some of these trains are connection trains to main line trains, the transfer station being Yenice.

References 

Railway stations in Mersin Province
Buildings and structures in Mersin
Railway stations opened in 1886
Transport in Mersin